This is a list of the lists of World Heritage Sites. A World Heritage Site is a place that is listed by the United Nations Educational, Scientific and Cultural Organization (UNESCO) as having special cultural or physical significance.

General lists

 Former UNESCO World Heritage Sites
 List of World Heritage in Danger
 List of World Heritage Sites by year of inscription
 World Heritage Sites by country

Lists by continent

Africa

 List of World Heritage Sites in Africa
List of World Heritage Sites in the Arab States
List of World Heritage Sites in Egypt
List of World Heritage Sites in Ethiopia
List of World Heritage Sites in Kenya
List of World Heritage Sites in Madagascar
List of World Heritage Sites in Mauritania
List of World Heritage Sites in Morocco
List of World Heritage Sites in South Africa
List of World Heritage Sites in Tanzania
List of World Heritage Sites in Tunisia
List of World Heritage Sites in Zambia
List of World Heritage Sites in Uganda
List of World Heritage Sites in Togo

Americas 

 List of World Heritage Sites in the Caribbean
List of World Heritage Sites in Cuba
 List of World Heritage Sites in Central America
 List of World Heritage Sites in North America
List of World Heritage Sites in Canada
 List of World Heritage Sites in the United States
List of World Heritage Sites in Mexico
 List of World Heritage Sites in South America
List of World Heritage Sites in Argentina
List of World Heritage Sites in Brazil
List of World Heritage Sites in Chile
List of World Heritage Sites in Colombia
List of World Heritage Sites in Peru

Asia

 List of World Heritage Sites in Eastern Asia
 List of World Heritage Sites in China
 List of World Heritage Sites in Japan
 List of World Heritage Sites in Mongolia
 List of World Heritage Sites in North Korea
 List of World Heritage Sites in South Korea
 List of World Heritage Sites in Northern and Central Asia
 List of World Heritage Sites in Kazakhstan
 List of World Heritage Sites in Kyrgyzstan
 List of World Heritage Sites in Tajikistan
 List of World Heritage Sites in Turkmenistan
 List of World Heritage Sites in Uzbekistan
 List of World Heritage Sites in Southeast Asia
 List of World Heritage Sites in Cambodia
 List of World Heritage Sites in Indonesia
 List of World Heritage Sites in Laos
 List of World Heritage Sites in Malaysia
 List of World Heritage Sites in Myanmar
 List of World Heritage Sites in the Philippines
 List of World Heritage Sites in Singapore
 List of World Heritage Sites in Thailand
 List of World Heritage Sites in Vietnam
 List of World Heritage Sites in Southern Asia
 List of World Heritage Sites in Afghanistan
 List of World Heritage Sites in Bangladesh
 List of World Heritage Sites in India
 List of World Heritage Sites in Nepal
 List of World Heritage Sites in Pakistan
 List of World Heritage Sites in Sri Lanka
 List of World Heritage Sites in Western Asia
 List of World Heritage Sites in the Arab states
 List of World Heritage Sites in Iran
 List of World Heritage Sites in Israel
 List of World Heritage Sites in Palestine
 List of World Heritage Sites in Jordan
 List of World Heritage Sites in Yemen

Europe

 List of World Heritage Sites in Eastern Europe
 List of World Heritage Sites in Armenia
 List of World Heritage Sites in Azerbaijan
 List of World Heritage Sites in Belarus
 List of World Heritage Sites in Bulgaria
 List of World Heritage Sites in the Czech Republic
 List of World Heritage Sites in Georgia
 List of World Heritage Sites in Hungary
 List of World Heritage Sites in Moldova
 List of World Heritage Sites in Poland
 List of World Heritage Sites in Romania
 List of World Heritage Sites in Russia
 List of World Heritage Sites in Slovakia
 List of World Heritage Sites in Ukraine
 List of World Heritage Sites in Northern Europe
 List of World Heritage Sites in Denmark
 List of World Heritage Sites in Estonia
 List of World Heritage Sites in Finland
 List of World Heritage Sites in Iceland
 List of World Heritage Sites in Latvia
 List of World Heritage Sites in Lithuania
 List of World Heritage Sites in Norway
 List of World Heritage Sites in Sweden
 List of World Heritage Sites in Southern Europe
 List of World Heritage Sites in Albania
 List of World Heritage Sites in Andorra
 List of World Heritage Sites in Bosnia and Herzegovina
 List of World Heritage Sites in Croatia
 List of World Heritage Sites in Cyprus
 List of World Heritage Sites in Greece
 List of World Heritage Sites in Italy
 List of World Heritage Sites in Malta
 List of World Heritage Sites in Montenegro
 List of World Heritage Sites in North Macedonia
 List of World Heritage Sites in Portugal
 List of World Heritage Sites in San Marino
 List of World Heritage Sites in Serbia
 List of World Heritage Sites in Slovenia
 List of World Heritage Sites in Spain
 List of World Heritage Sites in Turkey
 Vatican City is itself a World Heritage Site
 List of World Heritage Sites in Western Europe
 List of World Heritage Sites in Austria
 List of World Heritage Sites in Belgium
 List of World Heritage Sites in France
 List of World Heritage Sites in Germany
 List of World Heritage Sites in Luxembourg
 List of World Heritage Sites in the Netherlands
 List of World Heritage Sites in the Republic of Ireland
 List of World Heritage Sites in Switzerland
 List of World Heritage Sites in the United Kingdom

Oceania
 List of World Heritage Sites in Oceania (Australia, Kiribati, New Zealand, Papua New Guinea, and other Pacific Islands)